Eastern Mennonite University (EMU) is a private Mennonite university in Harrisonburg, Virginia. The university also operates a satellite campus in Lancaster, Pennsylvania, which primarily caters to working adults. EMU's bachelor-degree holders traditionally engage in service-oriented work such as health care, education, social work, and the ministry. EMU is especially known for its Center for Justice and Peacebuilding (CJP), especially its graduate program in conflict transformation.

More than half of EMU's undergraduate students do not come from Mennonite backgrounds, though the majority are Christian.

History
 Eastern Mennonite University was launched in 1917 as the Eastern Mennonite School by a handful of Mennonite church members. They recognized that their church-centered communities needed to offer schooling beyond the basic level for young-adult Mennonites. These church leaders sought to stem the tide toward enrolling in secular educational institutions. One of that founding group, Bishop George R. Brunk Sr., stated that "the world standard of education is self-centered, self-exalting, and materialistic." By contrast, he advocated a form of Christian education that "expands and develops the God-given powers both natural and spiritual, guides them [students] into channels of activity most conducive to God's glory and the blessing of mankind."

Eastern Mennonite's first registrar, John Early Suter, believed that the university should offer secular academics in addition to Bible classes, and he was one of the first two such teachers. The Suter Science Center was named in honor of J. Early Suter's son, Dr. Daniel Suter, who taught in the Biology department from 1948 to 1985. In 1947, the school began to offer bachelors degrees in subjects other than theology and changed its name for the first time, becoming Eastern Mennonite College.

In 1948–49, EMU admitted two local African American students, becoming one of the first historically white colleges in the U.S. South to integrate, defying written and unwritten rules enforcing segregation prior to the Civil Rights Act of 1964. (The University of Arkansas also admitted African American students, beginning in 1948.)

From exclusively serving members of the Mennonite church in the early and mid 1900s, EMU has evolved to educating thousands far beyond its original constituency of "Anabaptists," a broad term for Mennonites and kindred subscribers to the theology of Anabaptism. EMU and its seminary are affiliated with the Mennonite Education Agency of the Mennonite Church USA, as are five other higher education institutions in Kansas, Indiana and Ohio – Bethel College (Kansas), Goshen College, Bluffton University, Hesston College and Anabaptist Mennonite Biblical Seminary.

In 1994, the college changed its name for a second time, becoming Eastern Mennonite University.

In the last 20 years in particular, EMU has attracted people from all over the world and various faiths who are interested in the way it combines peace, social justice, simplicity and community. EMU orients its students toward "experiential learning" (i.e. hands-on learning, connected to real-world work), "creation care" (environmental sustainability), and "cross-cultural engagement" (required of all undergraduates).

The university made national news in 2015 when it, along with Goshen College (also associated with the Mennonite Church USA), added sexual orientation to their nondiscrimination policy. This allowed the school to begin hiring faculty or staff members who were in a same-sex marriage. The decision put the school somewhat at odds with its affiliated denomination, the Mennonite Church USA, and out of step with the interests of the CCCU, of which it was a founding member. This decision prompted two fellow Council for Christian Colleges and Universities (CCCU) member schools – Union University and Oklahoma Wesleyan University (OKWU) – to quit the organization in protest.  The two Mennonite schools later chose to withdraw their membership from the consortium in order to spare "significant division" within the CCCU's ranks.

Mission and values 
EMU attempts to graduate people oriented toward the wider world and toward helping others. The wider Mennonite culture of service is reflected in the university's mission statement. EMU is home to the Center for Justice and Peacebuilding, and its mission statement refers to Micah 6:8 on doing justice, loving mercy and walking humbly with God.

Environmentalism
 EMU claims that it is a leader among universities countywide in low-energy consumption, solar energy production, sustainable new construction, recycling, and composting efforts. Three residence halls meet the gold-level requirements of LEED (Leadership in Energy and Environmental Design).

Peace studies
The university hosts the Center for Justice and Peacebuilding (CJP) which includes a graduate program in conflict transformation. CJP has educated and trained more than 3,000 people from 124 countries. CJP's founding director, John Paul Lederach, and its expert in restorative justice, Howard Zehr, are considered to be international leaders in the fields of peace and justice.

Views on same-sex relationships
The school's "Community Lifestyle Commitment" statement had been cited as reason for terminating the employment of faculty and staff members who were sexually active gay men or lesbians. In 2004, then-President Loren Swartzendruber stated that the university's and Mennonite Church USA's policy was that "sexual relationships are reserved for a man and a woman in marriage" and applied equally to faculty members who are heterosexual. He noted that two heterosexual employees had also been let go after having extramarital sexual relationships.

However, in November 2013 EMU's Board of Trustees suspended the enforcement of its same-sex relationships policy and authorized Swartzendruber to lead a six-month study of whether or not to allow tenure-track faculty to pursue same-sex relationships without censure.

On 16 July 2015, EMU's board added "sexual orientation" to their non-discrimination policy, allowing for the hiring of faculty and staff involved in same-sex marriages.

Academics
As of 2010 EMU's undergraduate programs included 35 majors, 16 teacher education certification programs, 9 pre-professional programs such as pre-engineering and health sciences, and 4 associate degrees. Both the Harrisonburg and Lancaster locations offer an Adult Degree Completion Program. 98% of job-seeking graduate from the class of 2021 were employed within 12 months of graduation.

Each year EMU offers high-achieving high school students the opportunity to be part of the university's honors program. Selected students can receive 50% to 100% tuition scholarships, renewable for each year of undergraduate study. They also receive mentoring from assigned faculty members and attend honors seminars and social gatherings together.

Cross-cultural study requirement
 EMU was one of the earliest colleges to require cross-cultural study of all undergraduates, with a university-sponsored program beginning in the 1970s. EMU recommends that its undergraduate students earn 15 semester hours of credit by living, studying and serving in cross-cultural settings. Nine cross-cultural credits are the minimum number required for graduation; these can be earned through in-class study and a summer stint of three to six weeks in a cross-cultural setting. Most undergraduates embark on semester-long, faculty-led, cross-cultural experiences, usually involving home stays in non-U.S. settings, such as Israel, Guatemala, South Africa, India, Spain and Morocco. But some students opt to satisfy the cross-cultural requirement by studying and interning in Washington, D.C., while living in EMU-owned housing supervised by faculty members. Others choose individualized alternatives, such as a summer of studying business with an international manufacturer or 11 months of service with the SALT program of Mennonite Central Committee.

More than 75% of EMU's faculty members have lived in a cross-cultural context. The leaders of EMU-sponsored trips are drawn from the ranks of faculty and staff members who have had extensive experience in the settings to which they are leading students. Since 2001, three EMU faculty members have been Fulbright Scholars.

Seminary, graduate and summer programs
EMU's Graduate School offers master's degrees. Extensive summer study programs are available through: EMU's Summer Peacebuilding Institute (four consecutive sessions); Washington Community Scholars' Program; Summer Bridge Scholarship Program, in which EMU collaborates with the National Science Foundation to offer scholarships for incoming science students to spend a summer working with faculty; a Ministry Inquiry Program in which upper-level students are able to spend 11 weeks as an intern in a congregation; nine-day Summer Institute for Spiritual Formation; graduate-level courses for teachers. The Intensive English Program attracts students who need to improve their mastery of spoken and written English before continuing into higher studies at EMU or another American college.

Campus life

Expectations for community members
Eastern Mennonite's 361-word "Community Lifestyle Commitment" was adopted by the board of trustees in 2001. With this document as a guide, the institution expects its employees and students to commit themselves to a lifestyle based on "clearly stated expectations [to] promote orderly community life," coupled with "trust in and responsibility to one another". It calls for "stewardship of mind, time, abilities and finances" and takes the unusual step of asking for "social responsibility in my standard of living and use of economic resources". EMU expects community members to "respect and abide by the university policy that prohibits the use of alcohol and tobacco on campus or at university functions and the misuse of alcohol off campus".

The statement also asks community members to refrain from "sexual harassment and abuse, pornography, acts of violence, abusive or demeaning language and the use of illegal drugs" as well as "sexual relationships outside of marriage". However, the school does permit homosexual activity within the confines of marriage.

Campus ministries
Residential undergraduates, faculty, and staff gather for twice-weekly chapel services planned by the campus pastoral team. Voluntary Bible study and worship also occur in smaller settings during the week and on weekends.

The Campus Ministries program sponsors activities such as campus-wide chapels on Wednesday and Friday mornings, a student-led praise-style service on Sunday evenings, monthly hymn sings and Taize worship services, annual "spiritual life week", and service experiences under the Young People's Christian Association. Campus Ministries is led by the three trained pastors, assisted by students at various stages in their education including seminary students at EMU. Pastoral Assistants live in residence buildings and plan voluntary weekly activities.

Outdoor and indoor recreation
 As a result of EMU's location, bicycling is popular among the faculty and students as a means to commute, do errands, and for recreational jaunts around the countryside, both on and off roads.

Other popular outdoor activities are kayaking & canoeing, swimming, golfing, hiking, horseback riding, hunting & fishing, spelunking and skiing & other winter sports at nearby private and public parks and centers, such as Shenandoah National Park, George Washington and Jefferson National Forests, and Massanutten Four-Season Resort. On campus, students, staff and faculty maintain a greenhouse, an arboretum, and a large vegetable garden.

Indoor recreational features include gyms (for basketball, volleyball, indoor soccer, etc.), fitness center with exercise equipment, and climbing wall. Swimmers head 2.1 miles to the year-round municipal swimming pool at Westover Park.

Athletics

 EMU's sports teams are known as the Royals. In most sports, EMU competes as NCAA Division III, a member of the Old Dominion Athletic Conference. Sports include field hockey, cross country, basketball, volleyball, soccer, baseball, softball, indoor and outdoor track and field, and golf.

Extracurriculars
Two-thirds of EMU's students participate in intramural sports, playing against peers as well as college employees, in friendly, often coed competitions. In 2009–10, dozens of teams competed at various levels in basketball, billiards, floor hockey, flag football, golf, table tennis, and dodgeball.

Beyond physical activities, students at EMU are involved in clubs and groups typical of college campuses, such as student government, the student newspaper, literary magazine and theater productions.

Music
Students participate from a variety of choral and instrumental musical groups, including men's, women's, and mixed vocal ensembles, as well as chamber and wind ensembles, a jazz band, and a chamber orchestra. EMU's music department is home to the proficient hymnal editor, faculty member, and chamber singers director Ken J. Nafziger, who also directs and conducts the annual Shenandoah Valley Bach Festival and the Winchester Musica Viva.

Notable alumni
President of Somalia Hassan Sheikh Mohamud is an alumnus of Eastern Mennonite University's Summer Peacebuilding Institute. In 2001, he completed three of the SPI's intensive courses, studying mediation, trauma healing, and designing learner-centered trainings. He credits the tools and instruments that he acquired while attending the SPI with having equipped him with the necessary diplomatic skills to successfully engage challenging circumstances in his everyday work.

In August 2010 Glen D. Lapp '91 was among a group of 10 unarmed volunteers with International Assistance Mission in Afghanistan who were shot and killed while returning from providing health care in a remote region. "As with many of our alumni around the world, Glen was fulfilling EMU's mission of serving and leading in a global context, which often involves great personal sacrifice," said then university president, Loren Swartzendruber. Suraya Sadeed – an Afghan-American graduate of EMU's MA degree in conflict transformation and the founder and executive director of Help the Afghan Children – told a newspaper reporter that such murders would not deter her and others from continuing to provide humanitarian assistance in Afghanistan.

CJP alumna Leymah Gbowee was a co-recipient of the 2011 Nobel Peace Prize. In her autobiography, she speaks of EMU as "an American college with a well-known program in peace-building and conflict resolution" and with an emphasis on "community and service." 

In January 2015, the NPR program All Things Considered profiled the work of EMU alumnus Michael Sharp ('05) convincing FDLR fighters in the Democratic Republic of Congo to lay down their arms.
 Ingia Asfaw '62 – Leading cardiovascular surgeon in Michigan and major philanthropist on behalf of health care in Ethiopia.
 Esther Augsburger '79 — Artist and co-creator of Guns into Plowshares.
 Rick Augsburger '91 – Managing director of the KonTerra Group. Formerly deputy director and emergency services director for Church World Service.
 Kate Baer, '07, poet
 Emmanuel Bombande, MA '02 (in conflict transformation) – Executive director & co-founder of West Africa Network for Peacebuilding. Winner of the Millennium Excellence Peace Award 2005.
 Sam Gbaydee Doe, MA '98 (in conflict transformation) – Co-founder and first executive director of West Africa Network for Peacebuilding. , employed by United Nations on development and reconciliation. A fellow Liberian, worked with Leymah Gbowee on Liberian peace movement. Has PhD in social and international affairs from University of Bradford (UK).
 Leymah Gbowee, MA '07 (in conflict transformation) – A co-honoree for the 2011 Nobel Peace Prize for leading the women's peace movement that brought an end to 14 years of warfare in Liberia in 2003, most recently the Second Liberian Civil War.
 Ali Gohar, MA '02 (in conflict transformation) – Founding director of JustPeace International, which has combined restorative justice with traditional jirga practices into community-level conflict resolution implemented in much of Pakistan . Translator and adapter of Howard Zehr's Little Book of Restorative Justice into Pakistan's languages of Pushto, Urdu and Persian.
 Merle Good '69 – Writer and co-owner/publisher of Good Books, a supplier of books to Target, Costco, Wal-Mart and other major outlets, headquartered in Intercourse, Pa. Co-author with wife Phyllis Good of the bestselling 20 Most Asked Questions About the Amish and Mennonites.
 Maven Huffman '98 – Professional Wrestler best known for his time in the WWE and WWE Tough Enough.
 Erik Kratz '02 – Former Baseball Player for the Toronto Blue Jays, Philadelphia Phillies, Kansas City Royals, Milwaukee Brewers and the New York Yankees. Played in the 2014 World Series with Kansas City
 Donald Kraybill '67 – Expert on the Amish, Mennonites and other Anabaptist topics, frequently quoted in the worldwide media. Professor at Elizabethtown College. Author of more than 20 books, including the bestselling The Riddle of Amish Culture and the Upside-Down Kingdom, which won the National Religious Book Award in 1979.
 Glen D. Lapp '91 – A Mennonite Central Committee volunteer who was one of 10 members of the International Assistance Mission murdered on 21 August 2010 while returning from a medical relief trip in the mountains of northern Afghanistan.
 Joseph Lamar Lapp – Seventh President of Eastern Mennonite University (1987-2003)
 Hassan Sheikh Mohamud '01 – President of Somalia. Founder and Chairman of the Peace and Development Party (PDP). Co-founder of the Somali Institute of Management and Administration (SIMAD).
 Anthony Pratkanis '79 – Expert in techniques of propaganda and ways it can be recognized and resisted, often quoted by the media. Co-author, The Age of Propaganda: The Everyday Use and Abuse of Persuasion; founding editor of journal Social Influence.
 Larry Sheets '87 – Former major league baseball player for Baltimore, Detroit, Seattle.
 Allen Grant Stoltzfus '65 – Founder of Rosetta Stone language-learning software, in partnership with family members John Fairfield '70 and Eugene Stoltzfus '72
 Konrad Wert – known as Possessed by Paul James since 2005, an American folk singer, songwriter and musician
Joseph Boyd Martin '59 – American neurobiologist and previous dean of Harvard Medical School

Notable faculty 
 Hizkias Assefa – Part-time EMU professor since founding of CJP in 1995, who works internationally as mediator for protracted national conflicts in over 50 countries, often as a consultant to the United Nations, European Union or NGOs. Has master's degrees in law (from Northwestern) and in economics (from U. of Pittsburgh) and a PhD in public and international affairs from the University of Pittsburgh.
 Myron Augsburger '55, ThB '58 – Former president of EMU, global evangelist, author of more than 20 works of fiction and non-fiction.
 John Paul Lederach – Founding director of Center for Justice and Peacebuilding at EMU. Professor of international peacebuilding at the Joan Kroc Institute of the University of Notre Dame. Author, co-author, or co-editor of eight English-language books on peace, healing and/or reconciliation.
 Lisa Schirch – Former Fulbright Fellow and current faculty member at EMU's Center for Justice and Peacebuilding since the late 1990s. Executive director of 3D Security initiative at EMU. Author of five books on conflict prevention and peacebuilding. Huffington Post blogger and frequent public speaker on U.S. foreign policy. She holds a PhD in Conflict Analysis and Resolution from George Mason University.
Carol Ann Weaver – composer, pianist, and writer; former faculty member
 Howard Zehr – EMU professor known as "grandfather of restorative justice." Quoted widely on the subject in academic and media outlets. Author, editor or co-editor of more than 30 books, including the 16-volume series of Little Books on Justice and Peacebuilding.

References

External links
 Official website
 Official athletics website
 Eastern Mennonite University (Harrisonburg, Virginia, USA) at Global Anabaptist Mennonite Encyclopedia Online

 
Education in Harrisonburg, Virginia
Private universities and colleges in Virginia
Universities and colleges accredited by the Southern Association of Colleges and Schools
Universities and colleges affiliated with the Mennonite Church
Educational institutions established in 1917
Buildings and structures in Harrisonburg, Virginia
1917 establishments in Virginia
Mennonite schools in the United States